Iodixanol, sold under the brand name Visipaque, is an iodine-containing non-ionic radiocontrast agent.

It is available as a generic medication.

Medical uses
The radiocontrast agent is given intravenously for computed tomography (CT) imaging of the head, body, excretory urography and venography. The radiocontrast agent is also given intra-arterially for angiography imaging.

Adverse effects
About 30% of those received intravenous iodixanol injection has warmth, pain, or discomfort at the site of the injection. Other adverse effects include: taste pervesion (3.5%), nausea (2.8%), and headache (2.5%).

Society and culture

Available forms
The contrast can either be given intra-arterialy or intravenously.

Veterinary uses 
Iodixanol is also the active ingredient in a number of 'cushion' products used during the centrifugation of stallion semen. It is layered underneath the extended stallion semen allowing for a higher g force to be used with less sperm damage and better recovery rates. Post centrifugation the supernatant above and the cushion below is removed, leaving a concentrated sperm pellet in the conical tube.

References

External links
https://web.archive.org/web/20160825063320/http://www.cosmobiousa.com/axis-shield-density-gradient-optiprep.html 
http://www3.gehealthcare.com/en/products/categories/contrast_media/visipaque 
https://web.archive.org/web/20110927141156/http://www.gehealthcare.com/caen/md/docs/visipaquepieng.pdf
 

Iodoarenes
Radiocontrast agents
Benzamides
Acetanilides